The Mexican musk turtle  (Staurotypus triporcatus), also known commonly as the giant musk turtle, is a species of turtle in the family Kinosternidae. The species occurs in Central America and Mexico.

Geographic range
S. triporcatus is found in Belize, northeastern Guatemala, western Honduras, and Mexico. In Mexico it is found in the Mexican states of Campeche, Chiapas, Oaxaca, Quintana Roo, Tabasco, Tamaulipas, and Veracruz.

Description
S. triporcatus is typically much larger than other species of Kinosternidae, attaining a straight carapace length of up to 36 cm (14 in), with males being significantly smaller than females. It is typically brown, black, or green in color, with a yellow underside. The carapace is distinguished by three distinct ridges, or keels, which run the length.

S. triporcatus exhibits XX/XY sex determination, in contrast to the temperature-dependent sex determination of most turtles.

Diet
Like other musk turtle species, S. triporcatus is carnivorous, eating various types of aquatic invertebrates, as well as fish and carrion..

References

External links
Tortoise & Freshwater Turtle Specialist Group (1996). Staurotypus triporcatus. 2006 IUCN Red List of Threatened Species. Downloaded on 29 July 2007.

Further reading
Wiegmann AF (1828). "Beyträge zur Amphibienkunde ". Isis von Oken 21: 364–383. (Terrapene triiporcata, new species, pp. 364–365). (in German and Latin).

Staurotypus
Reptiles of Belize
Reptiles of Guatemala
Reptiles of Honduras
Reptiles of Mexico
Reptiles described in 1828
Taxonomy articles created by Polbot